18th Battalion may refer to:

 18th Battalion (Australia), a unit of the Australian Army 1915–1944
 2/18th Australian Infantry Battalion, a unit of the Australian Army 1940–1945
 18th Battalion (Western Ontario), CEF, a unit of the Canadian Expeditionary Force 1914–1917
 18th Logistics Battalion, a unit of the Belgian Army
 18th Battalion (New Zealand), a unit of the New Zealand Army 1939–1945

See also
 XVIII Corps (disambiguation)
 18th Division (disambiguation)
 18th Brigade (disambiguation)
 18th Regiment (disambiguation)
 18 Squadron (disambiguation)